KnockanStockan is an Irish independent music festival established in 2007.

Location
Each year the festival takes place on farmland overlooking the Blessington Lakes, near Blessington in County Wicklow.

History
In 2007, a musical weekend at The Ballyknockan Inn, with camping facilities available, offered forty acts.  Marketed as "A musician’s festival for musicians," this became the basis for KnockanStockan.  In 2008 the festival moved to a local farm, and grew to three days and three stages, with over 100 acts, and in 2009, it passed 140 acts.  Growth continued in 2010, and Dimestore Recordings and Jack of Diamonds Productions hosted a stage with the best of their acts from their weekly events.

In 2011, the Circus Tent, Fairy Field, family camping, and campervan facilities were added, and local Dublin and Bray bands from the festival formed a 'Busk Mob' in Dublin, singing classic rock hits.

The festival took a year off in 2017, but the organisers ran a series of "KnockanStockan presents" events instead.  The 2018 Festival is already announced.

Community connection
The communities of Lacken and Ballyknockan have become an integral part of the KnockanStockan music festival, and the organisers and artists have worked to give something back to the locality.  To date they have helped to raise thousands for numerous community and youth initiatives within the area, including a new school, and plans to build a new community centre.

Awards
In 2008 KnockanStockan won "Best Small Festival" at the Irish Festival Awards. In 2012, KnockanStockan was shortlisted for the Irish Times - The Ticket Festival Awards.

Irish Festival Awards
In 2012, KnockanStockan was nominated for six Irish Festival Awards. Including;
 Best Small Festival
 Best Line Up
 Social Responsibility Award

Compilations
Since 2010 KnockanStockan produced a series of compilation recordings. The first in the series featured music from,Enemies,The Hot Sprockets and spook of the thirteenth lock. The CD was on sale online, along with various other merchandise and memorabilia.

References

External links
 Official site
 Irish Festival Awards 2012

2000s in Irish music
Rock festivals in Ireland
Tourist attractions in County Wicklow
Indie rock festivals